VES Group (VES Group Co. Ltd.) is a holding company based in Thailand.  VES is a leading investor in Burma with interests in its main industries of logging, gem mining, jewellery, pearl farming, commercial fishing and tourism.  It is also involved in various construction and infrastructure projects in Burma.  The group is headed by Vikrom Aisiri, a Thai businessman and politician.  Aisiri also owns and operates the Andaman Club, an island casino cum golf resort on the island of Thahtay Kyun, under a concession from the Burmese government.  The group also controls the Dusit Island Resort in Chiang Rai and is building a new four star hotel in Ranong.  The group also has a long term eco-tourism concession on St. Lukes Island.

References
Myanmar Times, October 22-28, 2007 - "Gem industry will shine on, say traders"
 Khaleej Times, 19 October 2006, by Reuters. "Myanmar rubies, sapphires for sale at gems fair"

External links 
Andaman Club
Myanmar VES Joint Venture Co., Ltd.

Holding companies of Thailand
Holding companies with year of establishment missing